Transair Limited was an early post-World War II private, independent British airline formed in 1947. It began as an air taxi operator at Croydon Airport. In 1953, it started inclusive tour (IT) charter flights. By 1957, Transair became part of the Airwork group. The following year it shifted its operating base and headquarters to Gatwick Airport. In 1960, Transair was absorbed into British United Airways (BUA), as a result of the Airwork — Hunting-Clan merger.

History
In 1947, former Royal Air Force pilot Gerald "Gerry" Freeman founded Transair Ltd as an air taxi operator at Croydon Airport (London's main airport pre-war).

Following a difficult start, in Britain's poor economic conditions, the airline became very profitable by specialising in distributing newspapers. By 1952, the number of annual newspaper delivery flights using Avro Ansons exceeded 3,000. Transair's newspaper flights also established industry performance standards.

In 1953, Transair began flying British holidaymakers to sunnier climes in the Mediterranean following the signing of its first IT charter contract with Vladimir Raitz's Horizon Holidays. By that time, the airline's fleet was ten Douglas DC-3 Dakota piston airliners. Although all of these were second-hand, they were immaculately maintained.

By late 1956, Freeman was planning to shift Transair's operating base and headquarters from Croydon to Gatwick and to replace some of the ageing Dakotas with three new Vickers Viscount 800 series turboprops. He was also planning to build a new hangar at Gatwick for £300,000. Although he had £500,000 in retained profits, he needed a further £1m for the planned investment. Freeman's search for finance led to an offer from Airwork to buy him out. Airwork also offered to leave him in control of Transair and to give him a seat on the board of Airwork's holding company. Freeman's accepted Airwork's offer and Transair became an Airwork subsidiary the following year. During that time, the War Office invited new tenders for trooping flight contracts to Europe and the Far East, as a consequence of the Government's growing dissatisfaction with the operational performance and high costs of the ageing Handley Page Hermes fleet that was contracted from Airwork, Britavia and Skyways to operate most of these flights. The War Office awarded Transair the European contract, which was to be operated with the new Viscounts the airline had on order. The contract was to become effective from 1958.

By the time Transair joined Airwork, its operations encompassed the Viscount trooping contract between the United Kingdom and the Western Mediterranean, intensive mail and freight services under long-term charter contracts, IT flights, ad hoc night charters and a seasonal London—Jersey scheduled service.

In May 1958, Transair shifted its entire operation from Croydon to Gatwick. By that time, its fleet consisted of three Viscounts and ten Dakotas. On 30 May 1958, Transair operated the first commercial air service from Gatwick. Transair's Viscount 804 G-AOXU was the first aircraft of its type to be based at the airport. This was also the time the process of merging the Airwork-controlled airlines with Hunting-Clan to form BUA started.

During 1959, Transair recorded a profit of £400,000, as a result of which it became Airwork's most profitable airline subsidiary. Freeman's rigid attention to detail and the good systems he had put in place made Transair the most efficient Airwork airline. This in turn made Transair's financial performance superior to other Airwork airlines. In 1959 Airwork also took over Air Charter, Freddie Laker's first airline venture.

Following Airwork's takeover of Air Charter, the Airwork board put Freeman in charge of the entire group's UK and European short-haul operations. As part of this deal, Transair took over the management of all the group's UK regional services, leaving Laker to concentrate on the group's long-haul trooping flights and other long-distance charter services.

By the time Airwork merged with Hunting-Clan to form BUA in July 1960, the former's air transport subsidiaries already included Airwork Helicopters, Air Charter, Bristow Helicopters, Channel Air Bridge, Transair and Morton Air Services.

Fleet 
Transair operated the following aircraft types:
Avro Anson
Douglas DC-3
Vickers Viscount 804

In April 1958, the Transair fleet comprised 13 aircraft.

Another Viscount 804 was on order.

Accidents and incidents

There was one fatal accident involving a Transair aircraft.

On 19 August 1959, Douglas DC-3 (registration: G-AMZD)  a non-scheduled flight returning from Barcelona, operating under visual flight rules crashed into Mount Montseny in the Catalan Pre-Coastal Range after entering cloud, killing all 32 occupants.

See also
 List of defunct airlines of the United Kingdom

Notes
Notes

Citations

Sources

External links
 Gatwick Aviation Society website
 Transair Vickers Viscount 804 G-AOXU on the ramp at London Heathrow during the late 1950s

 
Defunct airlines of the United Kingdom
Airlines established in 1947
Airlines disestablished in 1960
1947 establishments in the United Kingdom